Highway 362 (AR 362, Ark. 362, and Hwy. 362) is a state highway in Monroe County. The route of  runs from US Highway 49 (US 49) east to Louisiana Purchase State Park. The route is maintained by the Arkansas State Highway and Transportation Department (AHTD).

Route description

Highway 362 begins at Highway 49 in eastern Monroe County within the Arkansas Delta south of Blackton. The highway runs due east as a section line road toward Louisiana Purchase State Park. After the last driveway, a gate operated by the Arkansas Department of Parks and Tourism will close when the park is closed. The roadway enters a headwater swamp, with large water tupelo and bald cypress trees forming an allée before terminating at a small parking lot for the park. Park visitors continue on an elevated foot bridge over the swamp to the Louisiana Purchase monument.

History
Highway 362 was created by the Arkansas State Highway Commission on November 26, 1969 by adding a county road to the state highway system to provide access to the Louisiana Purchase marker.

Major intersections

See also

References

External links

362
Transportation in Monroe County, Arkansas